Signe Thora Aas Danning (August 25, 1878 – February 10, 1980) was a Norwegian actress from the silent film era.

Danning was born in Kristiania (now Oslo). She was engaged with the National Stage in Bergen from 1897 to 1906, and it was there that she met the Danish composer Christian Danning. They married in 1902 and moved to Kristiania in 1906, where she played at the Fahlstrøm Theater and at a theater in Oslo's Tivoli amusement park. After four silent films, they relocated to Odense, Denmark in 1914. Following her husband's early death in 1925, she lived at the Grayfriars Monastery retirement home in Odense.

Filmography
1911: Bondefangeri i Vaterland as the White Rose
1911: Fattigdommens forbandelse
1911: Under forvandlingens lov as Camillo's wife Julia
1912: Hemmeligheden as Elise Halling

References

External links
 

1878 births
1980 deaths
Norwegian stage actresses
Norwegian film actresses
Norwegian silent film actresses
19th-century Norwegian actresses
20th-century Norwegian actresses
Actresses from Oslo
Norwegian emigrants to Denmark